Swansons Landing is a settlement and former inland port in Harrison County, Texas, United States, south of Caddo Lake.

References

Geography of Harrison County, Texas
Unincorporated communities in Texas